KAOS or Kaos may refer to:

People 
 Kaos One (born 1971), Italian rapper
 Kaos of Iberia, an ancient king of Causasian Iberia
 Kenny Kaos or Kaos (born 1970), American professional wrestler
 Wych Kaosayananda or Kaos (born 1974), Thai film director
 Kaos (drag queen), Canadian drag queen

Fiction 
 KAOS (Get Smart), a fictional criminal spy agency in Get Smart
 Kaos (film), a 1984 Italian film by Paolo and Vittorio Taviani
 Kaos (TV series), a mythological comedy created by Charlie Covell for Netflix
 The Ancient One (Ronin Warriors) or Kaos, a character from Ronin Warriors
 Kaos, a character from Battle Angel Alita
 Kaos, pen name of a character in the manga series Comic Girls

Video gaming 
 Kaos Studios, a defunct video game developer
 KAOS, a character in Donkey Kong Country 3: Dixie Kong's Double Trouble!
 KAOS, a fictional computer from Red Alert
 Kaos, the main antagonist character from the Skylanders video game series

Music 
 KAOS (FM), a radio station in Olympia, Washington, United States
KAOS FM NZ, radio station in Blenheim, Marlborough, New Zealand
 Kaos (Bo Kaspers Orkester album), 2001
 Kaos (Anita Tijoux album), 2007
 KAOS, a 1958 novelty 45 RPM record by Stanley Ralph Ross and Bob Arbogast
 Grupo KAOS, a Puerto Rican merengue music group

Computing 
 KAoS, a policy services framework
 KAOS (software development), a goal modeling method
 KaOS (Linux distribution) a linux distro

Other uses 
 Kaos Worldwide, a maker of technical clothing systems
 Assassin (game) or KAOS (Killing as organized sport), a live-action game

See also 
 k-os (born 1972)
 Radio KAOS (disambiguation)
 Chaos (disambiguation)